Baldur Bett (born 12 April 1980) is an Icelandic former footballer who last played for Reynir S. in the Icelandic Second Division.

Club career
Bett began his career at Aberdeen of the Scottish Premier League in 1998 but failed to secure a place in the starting XI and moved on to Peterhead in 2000. After just one season playing in the Scottish lower divisions, he signed for FH Hafnarfjörður in Iceland's Úrvalsdeild.

Personal life
He is the son of Scottish former footballer Jim Bett, and the brother of Calum Bett.

References

External links
 

1980 births
Living people
Sportspeople from Reykjavík
Icelandic footballers
Aberdeen F.C. players
Peterhead F.C. players
Baldur Bett
Fimleikafélag Hafnarfjarðar players
Baldur Bett
Scottish Premier League players
Scottish Football League players
Icelandic people of Scottish descent
Iceland youth international footballers
Association football midfielders
Icelandic people with family names